Rift Valley Academy (RVA) is a Christian boarding school located in Kijabe, Kenya run by the African Inland Mission. It was founded in 1906 by Charles Hurlburt.

It was ranked 2nd out of the top 100 best high schools in Africa by Africa Almanac in 2003, based upon quality of education, student engagement, strength and activities of alumni, school profile, internet and news visibility.

Notable alumni 
Erik Hersman
Jason Fader

See also 
List of boarding schools

References 
 2. https://rva.org/

 Honer, Mary Andersen (2003). Missy Fundi Kenya Girl. Lincoln, NE: iUniverse.

External links
 Official website of Rift Valley Academy

Boarding schools in Kenya
Private schools in Kenya
International schools in Kenya
Educational institutions established in 1906
Education in Rift Valley Province
1906 establishments in Kenya